Megabazus (Old Persian: Bagavazdā or Bagabāzu), son of Megabates, was a highly regarded Persian general under Darius, to whom he was a first-degree cousin. Most of the information about Megabazus comes from The Histories by Herodotus.

Scythian campaign (513 BC)
Megabazus led the army of the Persian King Darius I in 513 BC during his European Scythian campaign. After this had to be discontinued without result, Megabazos was left as commander-in-chief of an 80,000-man army in Europe, with the mission of subjugating the Greek cities on the Hellespont. The Persian troops first subjugated gold-rich Thrace after capturing Perinthos and the coastal Greek cities, and then defeated the powerful Paeonians, many of whom he deported to Phrygia.

Subjugation of Macedon

Finally, Megabazus sent envoys to Amyntas I, king of Macedon, demanding acceptance of Persian domination, which the king accepted. Megabazus received the present of "Earth and Water" from Amyntas, which symbolised submission to the Achaemenid Emperor. Amyntas then acted as hyparch to Darius I.

Disagreements arose when the members of the Persian delegation insulting the Macedonians by fraternising with their wives. The Macedonian prince Alexander I reacted to this by murdering several Persian diplomats and their followers. The conflict was later settled with the marriage of one of Megabazus' sons, Bubares, to the Macedonian princess Gygaia, a daughter of Amyntas.

After his return to Asia Minor, Megabazus received the governorship of the province (satrapy) of Hellespontine Phrygia and was based in its capital Daskyleion.

Rivalry with Histiaeus
Megabazus was suspicious of Histiaeus, tyrant of Miletus, and advised Darius to bring him to the Persian capital of  Susa to keep a closer eye on him.  His suspicions turned out to be well founded as Histiaeus provoked a revolt in the town of which he was formally in charge and later sided with the Greeks against Persia. The successor to Megabazus' command was Otanes (son of Sisamnes).

Family 
According to Herodotus (Herodotus 6.33) Oebares was a son of Megabazus, and became satrap of Daskyleion (Hellespontine Phrygia) in 493 BC.

Megabates was another son of Megabazus. He was a commander of the Achaemenid fleet that sailed against Naxos in 500/499 BC. He also was Satrap of Daskyleion in the early 470s.

Sons 
 Oebares: became satrap of Daskyleion c. 493 BC
 Bubares: managing engineer of the Athos Canal of Xerxes I
 Megabates: Achaemenid fleet commander and satrap of Daskyleion
 Pherendates: died c. 485 BC while satrap of Egypt.

References

See also
 Megabyzus
 Megabates

Military leaders of the Achaemenid Empire
Achaemenid Thrace
Achaemenid Macedon
Skudra
6th-century BC Iranian people
Generals of Darius the Great